Mercury(II) oxide, also called mercuric oxide or simply mercury oxide, is the inorganic compound with the formula HgO. It has a red or orange color. Mercury(II) oxide is a solid at room temperature and pressure. The mineral form montroydite is very rarely found.

History
An experiment for the preparation of mercuric oxide was first described by 11th century Arab-Spanish alchemist, Maslama al-Majriti, in Rutbat al-hakim.

In 1774, Joseph Priestley discovered that oxygen was released by heating mercuric oxide, although he did not identify the gas as oxygen (rather, Priestley called it "dephlogisticated air," as that was the paradigm that he was working under at the time).

Synthesis

The red form of HgO can be made by heating Hg in oxygen at roughly 350 °C, or by pyrolysis of Hg(NO3)2. The yellow form can be obtained by precipitation of aqueous Hg2+ with alkali. The difference in color is due to particle size; both forms have the same structure consisting of near linear O-Hg-O units linked in zigzag chains with an Hg-O-Hg angle of 108°.

Structure
Under atmospheric pressure mercuric oxide has two crystalline forms: one is called montroydite (orthorhombic, 2/m 2/m 2/m, Pnma), and the second is analogous to the sulfide mineral cinnabar (hexagonal,
hP6, P3221); both are characterized by Hg-O chains.  At pressures above 10 GPa both structures convert to a tetragonal form.

Uses
HgO is sometimes used in the production of mercury as it decomposes quite easily. When it decomposes, oxygen gas is generated.

It is also used as a material for cathodes in mercury batteries.

Health issues

Mercury oxide is a highly toxic  substance which can be absorbed into the body by inhalation of its aerosol, through the skin and by ingestion. The substance is irritating to the eyes, the skin and the respiratory tract and may have effects on the kidneys, resulting in kidney impairment. In the food chain important to humans, bioaccumulation takes place, specifically in aquatic organisms. The substance is banned as a pesticide in the EU.

Evaporation at 20 °C is negligible. HgO decomposes on exposure to light or on heating above 500 °C. Heating produces highly toxic mercury fumes and oxygen, which increases the fire hazard. Mercury(II) oxide reacts violently with reducing agents, chlorine, hydrogen peroxide, magnesium (when heated), disulfur dichloride and hydrogen trisulfide. Shock-sensitive compounds are formed with metals and elements such as sulfur and phosphorus.

References

External links

 National Pollutant Inventory – Mercury and compounds fact sheet
 Information at Webelements.

Oxides
Mercury(II) compounds
Inorganic compounds